Lord's (also known as Lord's  Cricket Ground) is a cricket venue in St John's Wood, London. Lord's is widely referred to as the "home of cricket". Lord's has hosted 130 Test matches, the first of these was in 1884 when England played the touring Australian team. The first One Day International (ODI) played at the ground, in 1972, was also between England and Australia, 56 ODIs have been played at the ground in total. Players who score a century in an innings in a Test match at Lord's also have their names placed on the Lord's Honours Boards.

The Englishman A. G. Steel became the first player to score a Test century at Lord's when he made 148 against Australia in 1884. The highest score at the ground is 333, which was scored by Graham Gooch in 1990. Gooch's innings, made against India, came from 485 deliveries. The record for the highest score by an overseas players belongs to the South African Graeme Smith. Smith scored 259 from 370 deliveries against England in 2003. Only two players, the Englishmen Graham Gooch and Michael Vaughan, have scored 6 Test centuries at Lord's. The Indian Dilip Vengsarkar is the only overseas player to have scored 3 Test centuries at the ground. There have been 244 Test centuries scored at the ground.

32 ODI centuries have been scored at Lord's to date. The first, 137 from 147 deliveries, was made by Dennis Amiss in 1975. Amiss's innings is also the highest ODI score by an Englishman at Lord's. The West Indians Clive Lloyd (102 against Australia in 1975) and Viv Richards (138 not out against England in 1979) scored centuries in the first two Cricket World Cup finals, Richards' innings holding the record for the highest ODI score at the ground. Marcus Trescothick has scored 3 ODI centuries at the ground. In 2016, Misbah-ul-Haq became the oldest player to score a test century at Lord's.

Key
 * denotes that the batsman was not out.
 Inns. denotes the number of the innings in the match.
 Balls denotes the number of balls faced in an innings.
 NR denotes that the number of balls was not recorded.
 Parentheses next to the player's score denotes his century number at Lord's.
 The column title Date refers to the date the match started.
 The column title Result refers to whether the player's team won, lost or if the match was drawn.

List of centuries

Test centuries

The following table summarises the Test centuries scored at Lord's.

One Day International centuries

The following table summarises the One Day International centuries scored at Lord's.

Women's One Day International centuries

The following table summarises the Women's One Day International centuries scored at Lord's.

References 

Lords
Cricket in London
Centuries
Centuries
Lord's